The Covers Record is the fifth album by Cat Power, the stage name and eponymous band of American singer-songwriter Chan Marshall. It was released in 2000 on Matador Records.

The album consists entirely of cover songs, with the exception of a new version of Marshall's song "In this Hole," which initially appeared on Cat Power's 1996 album What Would the Community Think.

Background 
The success of Cat Power's fourth album, Moon Pix (1998), led to high expectations for her follow-up, and made it difficult for her to live what she called “a normal life.” She elected to release an album of covers in part because she felt more comfortable playing covers than her own material. Between Moon Pix and what became The Covers Record, she scheduled a number of solo shows during which she played only covers. In order to take attention away from herself, she projected the 1928 French silent film The Passion of Joan of Arc behind her onstage.

Marshall's decision to release a covers album was reportedly disappointing to Matador, who considered her a “genius songwriter” and wanted to capitalize on the success of Moon Pix. According to Gerard Cosloy, the promotional campaign for The Covers Record, which he calls “a great album,” was intentionally “muted,” in order to allow it to “find its audience.” However, Marshall saw The Covers Record as a personal and important release, and interpreted this as lack of faith on the record company's behalf in the record's ability to connect with her audience.

Marshall's contract for The Covers Record was allegedly drafted on the spot on a Post-it note.

Recording 
The Covers Record features sparse instrumentation, with only Marshall on vocals and guitar or piano. The song “Salty Dog” features guitar by American musician Matt Sweeney.

The album was recorded at Night Owl Studios, Kampo Studios and Rare Book Room Studios, in New York City, in 1998 and 1999. According to Marshall, “I ended up in the studio recording with this young man at this place called Night Owl Studios across from Penn Station. I did most of the songs there just very, very, very, very quickly, and there’s like four songs that are from different recording sessions.”

Reception and legacy 

Rob Sheffield of Rolling Stone called the album "a stopgap" until the release of her next album of original material, but described her stripped-down version of the Rolling Stones' "Satisfaction" as "powerful." Spin called the album "essential," and wrote, "With only a guitar or piano, and a voice that is developing into one of the most expressive in rock, Marshall crafts deeply textured explorations of heartache, terror, longing, dismay, and emotions I'm pretty sure I've not found yet.... Rock will see few finer releases this year." Rhapsody (online music service) praised the album, calling it one of their favorite cover albums.

Dave Grohl, vocalist and guitarist of the Foo Fighters and former drummer of Nirvana, cited the album in a 2000 issue of NME, saying, "'Satisfaction' is the hit off that record, or so everybody thinks. But for me, it's that Velvet Underground song, "I Found a Reason". It's beautiful, beautiful, beautiful. My favourite." Grohl would work with Marshall on Cat Power's subsequent release, You Are Free (2003).

In 2005 the album was performed live in its entirety as part of the All Tomorrow's Parties-curated Don't Look Back series.

Several songs on the album have been used in films, including "I Found a Reason" (Saving Face, Dandelion andV for Vendetta), "Sea of Love" (Juno), and "Wild Is the Wind" (Into the Forest).

Track listing

Personnel 
Chan Marshall – vocals, guitar, piano
Matt Sweeney – guitar ("Salty Dog")

Charts 
Album – Billboard

As of March 2003, it has sold 52,000 units in the United States. Combined sales of The Covers Record and Moon Pix are 200,000 copies, as of 2001. As of 2023, Sea of Love was certified gold in Canada.

References

External links
 Notes on Cat Power's The Covers Record @ Lauriston.com

Cat Power albums
2000 albums
Covers albums
Matador Records albums